Ash cake (also known as Ash bread; Fire cake) is a type of bread baked over a layer of heated stones or sand and covered-over in hot ashes, a practice still found principally in Arabian countries, especially among Bedouins.

When the bread (fine flour) has been kneaded and has afterward fermented, it is kneaded again. They bake this bread not in an oven but on a rock. Collecting smooth stones and piling them upon the ground, by means of much brushwood they heat them until they make of the smooth (stones) glowing embers. Then they remove the ashes from them, cover them with dough, and again spread the ashes over all the dough, spreading it out as one loaf, and hence it is called "hidden," because [it is] concealed in the ashes.

According to Epiphanius, the Hebrew name for this bread is derived, etymologically, from its manner of being baked as "bread that is hidden." Once the bread is baked, it is removed from the ashes, and the ashes brushed-off the bread before allowing it to cool.

Other methods of preparation
In northern Yemen, ash cakes were called ğamrī, typically made thick, and baked directly over coals kept in a special vessel made of basalt-stone. In Arabia, ash cake is served with a treacle of date syrup (dibs) and with clarified butter (samne). 

In northern Iran, ash-cakes are prepared by laying out the dough over live coals carried in a brazier, upon which dough several pieces of hot coals are also carefully laid. Since the bread comes out hard and dry, it is customarily practised to break up the bread into small pieces and to mix it with butter and work it with one's hands to be formed into a ball before it can be made palatable.

In North America, ash cakes were primarily made by using cornmeal. Indigenous peoples of the Americas using ground corn for cooking are credited with teaching Europeans how to make ash cakes. The manner of preparation varied, although one popular method was to brush aside the hot ashes, lay a large collard green leaf upon the hot earth or cast-iron oven, upon which was poured a batter of cornmeal, and over which was laid another collard green leaf, and the hot ashes piled thereon.

In Europe, ash cakes were made into a small, round and flat loaf, usually consisting of a little wheat and sometimes rye, baked under an inverted iron pan over which the ashes of the fire were heaped. This was almost exclusively the bread of the peasants. In French, this type of bread was called fougasse.

Classic literature
The ash-cake described by A. Mizrachi (Arabic: ğamrī) is also baked directly over coals and thought to be a delicacy in South-Arabia.

See also
 List of flatbreads
 Johnnycake
 Taguella

References

External links
  (English) 
 Cooking Ash Cakes
  (Arabic) 

Arab cuisine
Breads
Baking
Middle Eastern cuisine
Maize dishes